Tikhon is a Slavic male given name of Greek origin, related to Western European Tycho.

Tikhon Bernstam (born 1979), American Internet entrepreneur
Tikhon Chicherin (1869–1904), Russian entomologist
Tikhon Dzyadko (born 1987), Russian journalist
Tikhon Khrennikov (1913–2007), Soviet composer
Tikhon Kiselyov (1917–1983), Soviet Belarusian statesman
Tikhon Moiseev (born 1978), Russian mathematician
Tikhon Streshnev (1649–1719), Russian nobleman and statesman
Tikhon Zhiznevsky (born 1988), Russian stage actor

Religious figures:
Patriarch Tikhon of Moscow (1865–1925)
Tikhon Mollard (born 1966)
Tikhon (Shevkunov) (born 1958)
Tikhon (Zaitsev) (born 1967)
Tikhon of Kaluga (ca. 1400–1492)
Tikhon of Zadonsk (1724–1783)

See also 
 Eastern Slavic naming customs
 Liturgy of Saint Tikhon

Russian masculine given names